Channel 53 refers to several television stations:

Canada
The following television stations operate on virtual channel 53 in Canada:
 CIVI-DT in Victoria, British Columbia

Mexico
The following television stations operate on virtual channel 53 in Mexico:
 XHMNU-TDT in Monterrey, Nuevo León

United States
The following low-power television stations, which are no longer licensed, formerly broadcast on analog channel 53 in the United States:
 KETK-LP in Lufkin, Texas

See also
 Channel 53 virtual TV stations in the United States

53